Bogandilla is a locality in the Western Downs Region, Queensland, Australia.

History 
Bogandilla Provisional School opened circa July 1918 as a half-time school (a teacher shared their time between 2 schools) with Noonga Provisional School, but became a full-time provisional school in 1919. Although Noonga is not an official place name as at 2019, there is a Noonga Creek in neighbouring Jackson North which is likely to be the location of the other school. It was closed in 1927 due to low student numbers.

References 

Western Downs Region
Localities in Queensland